State Route 38 (SR 38) is a south–north state highway in the state of Ohio. Its southern terminus is near Bloomingburg and Washington Court House at the U.S. Route 62 / SR 3 concurrency and its northern terminus is in Marysville at the intersection of 5th Street and Main Street where the road continues north as SR 31.

On its winding route through central Ohio, State Route 38 mainly offers views of rolling or flat farmland planted with corn, soybeans, and other crops. It also passes through a variety of towns including Bloomingburg, London, and Marysville.

History
When it was designated in 1923 along existing state highways, SR 38 traveled from Ripley on the Ohio River to Marion. This route included its current segment between Washington Court House and Marysville, but also served Russellville and Hillsboro. In 1927, the segment of SR 38 north of Marysville was deleted and renumbered by a relocated SR 4. The route would reach its long-time routing between Washington Court House and Marysville in 1932 when US 62 was brought into Ohio replacing SR 38 between Ripley and Washington Court House.

Between 2014 and 2015, State Route 38 was realigned south of Bloomingburg to replace State Route 238.  The old route of SR 38 between Bloomingburg and Washington Court House was turned over to Fayette County.

Major junctions

References

External links

038
Transportation in Fayette County, Ohio
Transportation in Madison County, Ohio
Transportation in Union County, Ohio